Jānis Daliņš (5 November 1904 – 11 June 1978) was a Latvian race walker. Competing in the 50 km event he won a silver medal at the 1932 Olympics, becoming the first Latvian to win an Olympic medal. He also won the 1934 European title and set seven world records in the 1930s. At the 1936 Olympics he led the race at 30 km, but abandoned the race due to a leg injury.

Biography
Daliņš started late, and had his first competition at the age of 22. A few months later he set a Latvian record in the 5000 m walk. In 1932, he set his first world record, over the 25 mile distance. After the 1936 Olympics Dāliņš semi-retired from athletics to work on his farm and raise his family. He resumed competing around 1940, and won the Latvian championships in 1942. In 1944 he moved from Latvia to Germany, where in 1947 he won his last race. In 1949 Dāliņš migrated to Australia, together wife Ella, daughter Rudite, and sons Ivars and Jānis. He was initially placed in the Bonegilla Migrant Reception and Training Centre in north east Victoria.  Jānis worked as a carpenter in the rural town of Benalla building many homes in post-war Australia. After completing his contracted time working in Benalla, he moved his family to Melbourne. There he raised his children, enjoyed his favorite hobby (fishing) and managed a sports club from 1959 to 1964.

In 1932 he was awarded the Order of the Three Stars 5th Class.

Legacy

Daliņš' success made race walking one of the most popular athletics disciplines in Latvia, with two more Latvians winning Olympic medals: Adalberts Bubenko in 1936 and Aigars Fadejevs in 2000. Daliņš is regarded as the best athlete of pre-World War II Latvia. A phrase: "Ak, kaut man Daliņa kājas būtu" ("Oh, if only I had Daliņš' legs", originally the title of a 1930s song) remains widely known in Latvia. Daliņš remains a well-known name in Latvia, with a stadium and a street in his hometown of Valmiera bearing his name.

References

External links

 
 
 

1904 births
1978 deaths
People from Valmiera
Latvian male racewalkers
Athletes (track and field) at the 1932 Summer Olympics
Athletes (track and field) at the 1936 Summer Olympics
Olympic silver medalists for Latvia
World record setters in athletics (track and field)
Latvian World War II refugees
Latvian emigrants to Australia
Athletes from Melbourne
European Athletics Championships medalists
Medalists at the 1932 Summer Olympics
Olympic silver medalists in athletics (track and field)